Trumps of Doom is a fantasy novel by American writer Roger Zelazny, the first book in the second Chronicles of Amber series and the sixth book in the Amber series. Whereas the first series was narrated by Corwin, this series is narrated by his son, Merlin. Trumps of Doom won the Locus Award for Best Fantasy Novel in 1986.

Plot summary
Merlin has spent the last several years on Earth learning computer science while building Ghostwheel, a trump- and pattern-based computer, elsewhere in Shadow. Having completed his project, he wishes to know who has been trying to kill him every April 30, and why some of the better attempts failed, before he leaves. He meets with his friend Lucas Reynard (Luke), a salesman, who tries to convince him to stay, and who tells him that Julia Barnes, Merlin's ex-girlfriend, may be in trouble. Merlin investigates and finds Julia slain by creatures from another shadow.

Merlin investigates through shadow, and is given orders by king Random to shut down Ghostwheel. However, Ghostwheel has become sentient and capable of defending itself. Eventually, Luke - who, it turns out, is Brand's son - imprisons Merlin in a blue crystal cave so he can attempt to take control of Ghostwheel for himself.

Cultural allusions
Merlin's landlord "Mr. Mulligan" is an allusion to Buck Mulligan from James Joyce's Ulysses.

Merlin tells Luke that Ghostwheel's operations involve "a lot of theoretical crap involving space and time and some notions of some guys named Everett and Wheeler". The Everett-Wheeler theory of quantum mechanics proposes a "many worlds" interpretation in which the universe instantly fragments into a bundle of alternate histories each time the quantum state of any particle in the universe changes via interaction.

At the conclusion of this volume, Merlin is imprisoned in a crystal cave, just like his namesake from Arthurian legend.

References

External links
 Trumps of Doom at Worlds Without End

1985 novels
The Chronicles of Amber books
1985 fantasy novels
Arbor House books